Thomas Sinclair Holden (6 January 1906 – 23 December 1973) was an Australian politician and judge.

He was born in Redfern to Thomas Douglas Percy Holden, also a politician. He attended Fort Street High School and in 1928 received a Bachelor of Law from the University of Sydney. He married Rose Scott Winden, with whom he had three children. From 1928 he practised as a solicitor, and was called to the bar in 1938. He specialised in workers' compensation. From 1934 to 1945 he was a member of the New South Wales Legislative Council, representing the United Australia Party and then, briefly, the Liberal Party. He resigned in 1945 to take up a judgeship on the District Court, where he remained until 1965. Holden died at Strathfield in 1973.

References

1906 births
1973 deaths
United Australia Party members of the Parliament of New South Wales
Liberal Party of Australia members of the Parliament of New South Wales
Members of the New South Wales Legislative Council
20th-century Australian politicians
Judges of the District Court of NSW
20th-century Australian judges